In enzymology, a 3-oxoadipate CoA-transferase is an enzyme that catalyzes the chemical reaction

succinyl-CoA + 3-oxoadipate  succinate + 3-oxoadipyl-CoA

Thus, the two substrates of this enzyme are succinyl-CoA and 3-oxoadipate, whereas its two products are succinate and 3-oxoadipyl-CoA.

This enzyme belongs to the family of transferases, specifically the CoA-transferases.  The systematic name of this enzyme class is succinyl-CoA:3-oxoadipate CoA-transferase. Other names in common use include 3-oxoadipate coenzyme A-transferase, and 3-oxoadipate succinyl-CoA transferase.  This enzyme participates in benzoate degradation via hydroxylation.

References

 

EC 2.8.3
Enzymes of unknown structure